The two Lule–Vilela languages constitute a small, distantly related language family of northern Argentina. Kaufman found the relationship likely and with general agreement among the major classifiers of South American languages. Viegas Barros published additional evidence from 1996–2006. However, Zamponi (2008) considers Lule and Vilela each as language isolates, with similarities being due to contact.

Internal classification
Internal classification of the Lule–Vilela languages by Mason (1950):

Lule–Vilela
Lule
Great Lule (of Miraflores, of Machoni)
Small Lule
Isistiné
Tokistiné
Oristiné
Vilela
Atalalá
Chunupí (Sinipé, Chulupí)
Yooc (Yoo, Wamalca)
Ocolé
Yecoanita
Pasain (Pazaine)
Omoampa (Umuapa)
Vacaa
Vilela
Ipa
Takete
Yoconoampa (Yecunampa)
Wamalca
(Malbalá ?)

Unclassfied languages are Tonocoté, Matará, and Guacará.

Vocabulary
Loukotka (1968) lists the following basic vocabulary items for Lule, Vilela, and Chunupí.

{| class="wikitable sortable"
! gloss !! Lule !! Vilela !! Chunupí
|-
! one
| alapea ||  || 
|-
! two
| tamop ||  || 
|-
! three
| tamlip ||  || 
|-
! head
| tokó || niskún || niskan
|-
! tooth
| l'ú || lupé || 
|-
! water
| to || má || maá
|-
! fire
| ikue || nié || nié
|-
! sun
| ini || oló || oló
|-
! moon
|  || kopi || kokpi
|-
! star
|  || tókxo || 
|-
! tree
| é ||  || 
|-
! maize
| pilis ||  || 
|-
! fish
| peás ||  || 
|-
! dog
|  || huan-okol || 
|-
! jaguar
|  || ikém || ikempé
|-
! black
|  || kirimit || 
|}

Proto-language

For reconstructions of Proto-Lule-Vilela by Viegas Barros (2006), see the corresponding Spanish article.

References

External links
Alain Fabre. 2005. Diccionario etnolingüístico y guía bibliográfica de los pueblos indígenas sudamericanos. 'Lule–Vilela'

 
Languages of Argentina
Language families